was a Japanese actor, voice actor, narrator and the brother of voice actor Gorō Naya (1929–2013). He was a lifelong resident of Tokyo and was affiliated with Mausu Promotion at the time of his death.

Filmography

Television animation
1970
 Akakichi no Eleven (Masada, Takeshi Kamioka)

1973
 Samurai Giants (Tarobei Hatsuma)

1974
 Urikupen Kyūjotai (Narrator)

1976
 Dokaben (Hikaru Yoshitsune)

1977
 Wakakusa no Charlotte (Night)

1978
 Space Battleship Yamato II (Yasuhiko Yamada)
 Galaxy Express 999 (Burudasu)
 Future Boy Conan (Territ)
 Lupin III: Part II (Aide, Kousuke Kindani, Stephan)

1979
 Toshi Gordian (Barry Hawk)

1980
 Tondemo Senshi Muteking (Sonny Yuki)
 The Wonderful Adventures of Nils (Marcos)
 Mū no Hakugei (Cold, Kaim)
 Ashita no Joe 2 (Wolf Kanagushi)

1981
 Urusei Yatsura (Hanawa)
 Rokushin Gattai God Mars (Gira)

1982
 Fairy Princess Minky Momo (Papa)

1984
 Saber Rider and the Star Sheriffs (Frantz)
 Chikkun Takkun (Papa)

1985
 Ninja Robots (Kegare Sanada)
 Magical Star Magical Emi (Junichi Kazuki)
 Lupin III Part III (Doron)

1986
 Saint Seiya (Aquarius Camus)
 Highschool! Kimengumi (Kyū Daima)
 Maison Ikkoku (Kozue's Father)

1987
 City Hunter (General)

1988
 City Hunter 2 (Ishikawa)
 Hello! Lady Lin (George)

1989
 The New Adventures of Kimba The White Lion (Lamp)
 Ranma ½ (Hyottoko/Ryuukichi)

1990
 Tanoshii Moomin Ikka (Fredrickson)

1991
 Anime Himitsu no Hanazono (Henry)
 Three Little Ghosts (Chokkiri-san)

1992
 Crayon Shin-chan (Enchou, Professor Gou)
 Lupin the 3rd: From Siberia with Love (Duke Brown)

1993
 Tico and Friends (Thomas LeConte)
 YuYu Hakusho (Shinobu Sensui)

1994
 Juuni Senshi Bakuretsu Eto Ranger (Nyorori)
 Street Fighter II V (Dorai)

1997
 Flame of Recca (Mori Kouran)

1998
 Super Doll Licca-chan (Dr. Scarecrow)
 The Mysterious Cities of Gold (Casper)
 Tokyo Pig (Old Man)

1999
 Kyoro-chan (Dr. Matsgeer, Inspector Nirami)

2000
 Hidamari no Ki (Ushikubo Tohbei)

2001
 Noir (Zellner)
 Hikaru no Go (Honinbou Kuwabara)
 Pokémon (Keith Basquiat)

2002
 Asobotto Senki Goku (Kyuzou)
 Jing: King of Bandits (King Cointreau)
 Patapata Hikōsen no Bōken (Agenore San Bellan)
 Mirage of Blaze (Ujimasa Hojo)

2003
 Astro Boy (Dr. Pavlos)
 Avenger (Metis)

2004
 Destiny of the Shrine Maiden (Orochi)
 Zatch Bell! (Dr. Riddles)

2005
 Gallery Fake (Jimi)
 Jinki:Extend (Genta Ogawara)
 Black Cat (Maison Ordrosso)

2006
 Black Jack (Old Man)
 Pokemon Advance (Teira)
 Ramen Fighter Miki (Toshiyuki)

2007
 Oh! Edo Rocket (Goinkyo)
 Emily of New Moon (Jimmy Murray)
 Reideen (Furuki)

2008
 Nogizaka Haruka no Himitsu (Ouki Nogizaka)
 Mokke (Skeleton)
 Lupin III: Sweet Lost Night - Magic Lamp's Nightmare Premonition - Jodan

2009
 Umi Monogatari ~Anata ga Ite Kureta Koto~ (Matsumoto)
 Guin Saga (Gajus)
 The Book of Bantorra (Ganbanzel Grof)
 Fullmetal Alchemist: Brotherhood (Grumman)
 One Piece (Haredas)

2010
 Psychic Detective Yakumo (Hideyoshi Hata)
 Durarara!! (Old Painter)
 The Legend of the Legendary Heroes (King of Nelpha)
 In Solitude Where We Are Least Alone (Akira's Grandfather)
 Rainbow - Nisha Rokubō no Shichinin (Hayakawa)

2011
 Digimon Xros Wars (Kotemon)

2012
 Eureka Seven AO (Christophe Blanc)

2014
 Knights of Sidonia (Old Man)

Theatrical animation
 Golgo 13 (1983) (Bishop Moretti)
 Nitaboh (2004) (Osyo)
 Crayon Shin-chan series (1993–2014) (Enchou) 
 Professor Layton and the Eternal Diva (2009) (Dr. Andrew Schraeder)
 Fuse Teppō Musume no Torimonochō (2012) (Zanzo)

Original video animation (OVA)
 FAKE (1996) (Leonard Henry)
 Shamanic Princess (1996) (The Throne of Yord)
 Batman: Gotham Knight (2008) (James Gordon)

Video games
 Lunar: The Silver Star (1992) (Ghaleon)
 Lunar: Eternal Blue (1994) (Ghaleon)
 Grandia (1997) (Gadwin)
 Panzer Dragoon Saga (1998) (Zadoc)
 Jade Cocoon: Story of the Tamamayu (1998) (Kikinak, Wind Boss)
 Spyro 2: Ripto's Rage (1999) (Foreman Bud)
 Professor Layton and the Diabolical Box (2008) (Dr. Andrew Schraeder)
 Galaxy Angel (2002) (Luft Weizen)
 Way of the Samurai 4 (2011) (Kinugawa Onsen)
 Chaos Rings II (2012) (Death)
 Zero Escape: Virtue's Last Reward (2012) (Tenmyouji)
 Etrian Odyssey Untold 2: The Fafnir Knight (2014) (Reischutz)
 Fire Emblem Fates (2015) (Gunter, Anankos)
Fire Emblem Heroes (2017) (Gunter)

Tokusatsu
 Jaguar-man (1967) (Taro Gingaker (Voice)/Jaguar-man)
 Kamen Rider (1971) (Takeshi Hongo (Voice)/Kamen Rider Ichigo in episodes #9 - 10)
 Robot Detective (1973) (Missileman (ep. 22))
 Chojin Bibyun (1976) (Haniwarn (ep. 13))
 Gekisou Sentai Carranger (1996) (XX Mileno (ep. 27))
 Seijuu Sentai Gingaman (1998) (Wisdom Tree Moak (eps. 3 - 48, 50))
 Juken Sentai Gekiranger (2007) (Sky Fist Demon Kata (eps. 1, 10 - 34))
 Samurai Sentai Shinkenger (2009) (Ayakashi Nakinakite (ep. 13))

Dubbing roles

Live-action
William H. Macy
 Homicide (Tim Sullivan)
 ER (David Morganstern)
 A Civil Action (James Gordon)
 Psycho (Milton Arbogast)
 Jurassic Park III (Paul Kirby)
 In Enemy Hands (Nathan Travers)
 Bobby (Paul Ebbers)
 A Single Shot (Pitt)
Brad Dourif
 Child's Play 2 (Chucky)
 Child's Play 3 (Chucky)
 Bride of Chucky (Chucky)
 Seed of Chucky (Chucky)
 Curse of Chucky (Chucky)
Ed Harris
The Firm (1999 Fuji TV edition) (Agent Wayne Terrance)
 Milk Money (Tom Wheeler)
 Apollo 13 (Gene Kranz)
 The Truman Show (DVD edition) (Christof)
Gary Oldman
 Batman Begins (James Gordon)
 The Dark Knight (James Gordon)
 The Dark Knight Rises (James Gordon)
 24 (Christopher Henderson (Peter Weller))
 The 36th Chamber of Shaolin (Hung Hsi-Kuan)
 Another Stakeout (Tony Castellano (Miguel Ferrer))
 Assault on Precinct 13 (1980 TV Tokyo edition) (Lawson (Martin West))
 Awakenings (DVD edition) (Dr. Kaufman (John Heard))
 Casualties of War (DVD edition) (Sergeant Tony Meserve (Sean Penn))
 Dave (Dave Kovic (Kevin Kline))
 Dead Again (Gray Baker (Andy García))
 Dick Tracy (Mumbles (Dustin Hoffman))
 Dragonheart (Lord Felton (Jason Isaacs))
 Dragons Forever (Hua Hsien-Wu (Yuen Wah))
 Explorers (1992 Fuji TV edition) (Mr. Müller (James Cromwell)) (Recorded on DVD)
 The Extraordinary Adventures of Adèle Blanc-Sec (Dieuleveult (Mathieu Amalric))
 From the Earth to the Moon (Georges Méliès (Tchéky Karyo))
 Garden State (Gideon Largeman (Ian Holm))
 Ghostbusters II (Egon Spengler (Harold Ramis))
 The Goonies (1988 TBS edition) (Francis Fratelli (Joe Pantoliano)) (Regular Version Recorded on 25th Anniversary DVD and Bluray, and Uncut Version recorded on 35th Anniversary Blu-ray)
 Goosebumps (Mr. Matthews (Maurice Godin)) (Attack of the Mutant Parts I & II)
 The Great Gatsby (1984 TBS edition) (George Wilson (Scott Wilson))
 Harlem Nights (Sugar Ray (Richard Pryor))
 Hawaii Five-0 (Elliott Connor  (James Remar))
 The Hunt for Red October (DVD edition) (Commander Bart Mancuso (Scott Glenn))
 In The Heat of the Night (1983 TBS edition) (Harvey Oburst (Scott Wilson)) (Recorded on Blu-ray alongside the NET Dub)
 Invasion of the Body Snatchers (1986 TBS edition) (Jack Bellicec (Jeff Goldblum)) (Recorded on Blu-ray)
 Jurassic Park (Donald Gennaro (Martin Ferrero))
 The Killer (Fung Sei)
 The Lost World: Jurassic Park (Eddie Carr (Richard Schiff))
 Mad Max Beyond Thunderdome (1988 Fuji TV edition) (The Pig Killer (Robert Grubb))
 Major League (DVD edition) (Roger (Corbin Bernsen))
 Missing in Action 2: The Beginning (1988 TV Tokyo edition) (Lieutenant Anthony Mazilli) (Recorded on Blu-ray)
 The Mummy (DVD edition) (Dr. Allen Chamberlain (Jonathan Hyde))
 North by Northwest (1971 Tokyo Channel 12 edition) (Leonard (Martin Landau))
 Not a Penny More, Not a Penny Less (Robin Oakley (Nicholas Jones))
 The Peacemaker (Vlado Mirić (Rene Medvešek))
 The Pelican Brief (Thomas Callahan (Sam Shepard))
 Police Story (1987 Fuji TV edition) (Superintendent Raymond Li (Lam Kwok-Hung)) (Recorded on DVD and Blu-ray)
 Prometheus (Peter Weyland (Guy Pearce))
 The River Wild (Tom Hartman (David Strathairn))
 Scent of a Woman (Mr. Trask (James Rebhorn))
 Stormbreaker (Alan Blunt (Bill Nighy))
 Super Mario Bros. (1994 NTV edition) (Spike (Richard Edson)) (Recorded on Blu-ray)
 Switchback (Jack McGinnis (William Fichtner))
 Trouble with the Curve (Gus Lobel (Clint Eastwood))
 Vegas Vacation (Clark Griswold (Chevy Chase))
 West Side Story (1990 TBS edition) (Doc (Ned Glass))

Animation
 Animaniacs (Ferman Flaxseed)
 Batman: The Animated Series (Scarecrow)
 Darkwing Duck (The Liquidator/Bud Flud)
 Heathcliff and the Catillac Cats (Grandpa Nutmeg)
 Iron Man (Century, Justin Hammer)
 J.R.R. Tolkien's The Lord of the Rings (Gollum)
 Meet the Robinsons (Bud)
 One Hundred and One Dalmatians (Roger Radcliffe)
 Rango (Spoons)
 SpongeBob SquarePants (Squidward Tentacles, Mermaid Man, Patchy the Pirate, Flying Dutchman, Dirty Bubble, and Additional Voices (seasons 1-8))
 The New Batman Adventures (Scarecrow)
 Tarzan II (Zugor)
 Thomas the Tank Engine & Friends (Sir Topham Hatt (succeeding Takeshi Aono) and Sir Lowham Hatt)
 The Simpsons (Mayor Quimby (season 2, first appearance), J. Loren Pryor (season 2) and Additional Voices (season 1))
 TUGS (Captain Star, Bluenose, Izzy Gomez, The Pirates and The Fuel Depot Owner)
 X-MEN (Professor X)

Live-action and Animation
 Who Framed Roger Rabbit (Psycho/Mickey Mouse)

References

External links
 Official agency profile 
 

1932 births
2014 deaths
Japanese male stage actors
Japanese male video game actors
Japanese male voice actors
Japanese theatre directors
Male voice actors from Tokyo
Mausu Promotion voice actors
20th-century Japanese male actors
21st-century Japanese male actors